Afrixalus sylvaticus is a species of frog in the family Hyperoliidae. Its common name is forest banana frog or forest spiny reed frog.

It is found in Kenya and Tanzania. Its natural habitats are subtropical or tropical dry forests, subtropical or tropical moist lowland forests, intermittent freshwater marshes, plantations, and heavily degraded former forest. It is threatened by habitat loss.

References

sylvaticus
Amphibians of Tanzania
Amphibians of Kenya
Taxa named by Arne Schiøtz
Taxonomy articles created by Polbot